The Red Porch or Red Staircase (Krasnoe Kryltso), decorated with stone lions, leads into the Palace of Facets in the Kremlin, Moscow.

In old Russian the word krasny meant "beautiful", but today it means "red".  This is the same word used for "Red Square".

On the morning of his coronation, the Tsar was met at the Red Porch, where he took his place beneath a large canopy held by thirty-two Russian generals, with other officers providing additional support. Accompanied by his consort (under a separate canopy) and the imperial regalia, he proceeded slowly toward the Cathedral of the Dormition, where his crowning and anointing would take place. After the service, the Emperor and Empress proceeded under canopies back to the Red Porch of the Kremlin, where they rested and prepared for a great ceremonial meal at the Kremlin's Hall of Facets. During their procession back to their Kremlin palace, later rulers (starting with Nicholas I) stopped on the Red Staircase and bowed three times to the assembled people in the courtyard, symbolizing what one historian has called "an unspoken bond of devotion" between ruler and subjects.

In the 1930s the porch was destroyed, and its place was taken by an unimpressive Kremlin canteen. In 1994 the Red Porch was the first of Moscow’s monuments to be restored.

.

Buildings and structures in Moscow